Euxenus is a genus of fungus weevils in the beetle family Anthribidae. There are about 14 described species in Euxenus.

Species
These 14 species belong to the genus Euxenus:

 Euxenus acanthoceroides Wolfrum, 1930
 Euxenus apicalis Faust, 1896
 Euxenus ater Blatchley, 1928
 Euxenus gracillimus Hustache, 1930
 Euxenus jordani Valentine, 1991
 Euxenus obscurus Hustache, 1930
 Euxenus orchestoides Hustache, 1930
 Euxenus ornatipennis Champion, 1905
 Euxenus piceus Lec., 1878
 Euxenus posticus Faust, 1896
 Euxenus punctatus LeConte, 1876
 Euxenus rhombifer Champion, 1905
 Euxenus subparallelus Champion, 1905
 Euxenus variegatus Hustache, 1924

References

Further reading

 
 

Anthribidae
Articles created by Qbugbot